The Channel Islands are an eight-island archipelago located within the Southern California Bight in the Pacific Ocean, off the coast of California. The four Northern Channel Islands are part of the Transverse Ranges geologic province, and the four Southern Channel Islands are part of the Peninsular Ranges province. Five of the islands are within the Channel Islands National Park, and the waters surrounding these islands make up Channel Islands National Marine Sanctuary. The Nature Conservancy was instrumental in establishing the Channel Islands National Marine Sanctuary. The islands were inhabited as early as 13,000 years ago, the earliest paleontological evidence of humans in North America. They are the easternmost islands in the Pacific Island group.

The Chumash and Tongva Native Americans who lived later on the islands may be the descendants of the original inhabitants, but they were then displaced by Spaniards who used the islands for fishing and agriculture. The U.S. military uses the islands as training grounds, weapons test sites, and as a strategic defensive location. The Channel Islands and the surrounding waters house a diverse ecosystem with many endemic species and subspecies. The islands harbor 150 unique species of plant.

Characteristics 
The eight islands are split among the jurisdictions of three California counties: Santa Barbara County (four), Ventura County (two), and Los Angeles County (two). The islands are divided into two groups; the northern Channel Islands and the southern Channel Islands. The four northern Islands used to be a single landmass known as Santa Rosae.

Five of the islands (San Miguel, Santa Rosa, Santa Cruz, Anacapa, and Santa Barbara) were made into the Channel Islands National Park in 1980.

Santa Catalina Island is the only one of the eight islands with a significant permanent civilian settlement—the resort city of Avalon, California, and the unincorporated town of Two Harbors. University of Southern California also houses its USC Wrigley Institute for Environmental Studies marine lab in Two Harbors.

The Channel Islands National Park mainland visitor center in Ventura Harbor received 342,000 visitors in 2014. The islands attract around 70,000 tourists a year, mostly during the summer. Visitors can travel to the islands via public boat or airplane transportation. Camping grounds are available on Anacapa, Santa Rosa, Santa Cruz, San Miguel, and Santa Barbara Islands in the Channel Islands National Park. Attractions include whale watching, hikes, snorkeling, kayaking and camping.

Natural seepage of oil occurs at several places in the Santa Barbara Channel. Tar balls or pieces of tar in small numbers are found in the kelp and on the beaches. Native Americans used naturally occurring tar, bitumen, for a variety of purposes which include roofing, waterproofing, paving and some ceremonial purposes.

The Channel Islands at low elevations are virtually frost-free and constitute one of the few such areas in the 48 contiguous US states. It snows only rarely, on higher mountain peaks.

Islands

History

Earliest humans in North America
Separated from the California mainland throughout recent geological history, the Channel Islands provide the earliest evidence for human seafaring in the Americas. It is also the site of the discovery of the earliest paleontological evidence of humans in North America.   The northern Channel Islands are now known to have been settled by maritime Paleo-Indian peoples at least 13,000 years ago.

The Arlington Springs Man was discovered in 1960 at Arlington Springs on Santa Rosa Island. The remains were dated to 13,000 years BP.

The Tuqan Man was discovered on San Miguel Island in 2005. His remains were exposed by beach erosion, and were preserved by University of Oregon archeologists. His age was determined to be about 10,000 years.

Archeological sites on the island provide a unique and invaluable record of human interaction with Channel Island marine and terrestrial ecosystems from the late Pleistocene to historic times. The Anacapa Island Archeological District is a  historic district that was listed on the National Register of Historic Places (NRHP) in 1979.

Indigenous peoples

Historically, the northern islands were occupied by the island Chumash, while the southern islands were occupied by the Tongva.

The earliest known Chumash village site is on Santa Rosa Island. It belongs to the period around 7,500 BP. Soon after, the population density on the islands began to rise. Significant increase in fish and marine mammal exploitation has been observed.

Around 2,500 BP (500 BC), there was significant evolution in technology and increasing reliance on fishing. The circular shell fishhooks were increasingly used. Mortars and pestles were manufactured on San Miguel Island for trade with the mainland.

A new type of boat created by the Chumash known as tomol and by the Tongva as te'aats, appeared on the islands around 1,500 BP (500 AD). The boat had become an critical part of Chumash and Tongva culture by 650 AD.

Modern history

The Nicoleño
200 – 300 (1800, est.) The Nicoleño were an Uto-Aztecan Native American people who lived on San Nicolas Island in California. The population was "left devastated by a massacre in 1811 by sea otter hunters". The group's last surviving member was given the name Juana Maria, and was born before 1811 and died in 1853. Juana Maria, better known to history as the "Lone Woman of San Nicolas Island" (her native name is unknown), lived alone on San Nicolas Island from 1835 until her removal from the island in 1853, when men discovered her inside a hut made of whalebones and brush. Juana Maria's fondness for green corn, vegetables, and fresh fruit caused severe attacks of dysentery. In her weakness, she fell from Nidever's porch and injured her spine. On Oct. 18, 1853, only seven weeks after arriving on the mainland, she died of dysentery in Garey, California at age 43. Before she died, Father Sanchez baptized and christened her with the Spanish name Juana Maria. She was buried in an unmarked grave on the Nidever family plot at the Santa Barbara Mission cemetery.

Aleut hunters visited the islands to hunt otters in the early 1800s. The Aleuts purportedly clashed with the native Chumash, killing many over trading disputes. Aleut interactions with the natives were detailed in Scott O'Dell's novel Island of the Blue Dolphins which described the indigenous peoples living on the island.

The Chumash and Tongva were removed from the islands in the early 19th century and taken to Spanish missions and pueblos on the adjacent mainland. For a century, the Channel Islands were used primarily for ranching and fishing activities. Several of the islands were used by whalers in the 1930s to hunt for sperm whales. This had significant impacts on island ecosystems, including the local extinction of sea otters, bald eagles, and other species. For example, decline in the local otter population led to population growth of their prey, the black abalone. As a result, the Channel Islands became an important stop in the 1850s for Chinese-American fishermen who harvested the abalone and exported them to Hong Kong.

As most of the Channel Islands are managed by federal agencies or conservation groups, the restoration of the island ecosystems has made significant progress. An example of conservation progress has been the bald eagle, which was threatened due to DDT contamination, but whose populations are now recovering. With the help of scientists from the USC Wrigley Institute for Environmental Studies, the Catalina Island Fox has also recovered from a low of 100 individual foxes to over 1,500 foxes in 2018.

Occasional discussion on the status of the islands has arisen because they (and the Farallon Islands) were not specifically mentioned in the Treaty of Guadalupe Hidalgo which ceded northern Mexico to the United States.  Citing these perceived legal ambiguities, in at least two cases settlers created unrecognized Micronations there.  A 1944 review by the Mexican government apparently concluded that it had no claim to them, and a 1978 maritime treaty with the U.S. formally closed the issue.

In 1972, in "a bit of political theater", twenty-six Brown Berets sailed to Catalina Island on tourist boats, set up a small encampment near the town of Avalon, put up a Mexican flag and claimed the island on behalf of all Chicanos, citing the Treaty of Guadalupe Hidalgo. Twenty-four days later, sheriff's deputies took everyone back to the mainland.

Military use
The United States Navy controls San Nicolas Island and San Clemente Island, and has installations elsewhere in the chain. During World War II all of southern California's Channel Islands were put under military control, including the civilian-populated Santa Catalina where tourism was halted and established residents needed permits to travel to and from the mainland. San Miguel Island was used as a bombing range and Santa Barbara Island as an early warning outpost under the presumed threat of a Japanese attack on California. San Clemente Island was used to train the Navy's first amphibious force to prepare for Pacific combat against the Japanese in World War II.
San Nicolas Island has been used since 1957 as a launch pad for research rockets. Santa Rosa Island was used in 1952 as a base for the USAF 669th AC&W Squadron and they operated two Distant Early Warning FPS-10 radars from the hilltops there. In 1955 another FPS-3 search radar was added, and in 1956, a GPS-3 search radar was installed. A new MPS-14 long-range height-finder radar was installed in 1958. The base was shut down in March 1963, when the 669th was moved to Vandenberg AFB near Lompoc, California. The islands still house US Navy SEALs training facilities, including Naval Auxiliary Landing Field San Clemente Island.

Wildlife

The Channel Islands form part of one of the richest marine ecosystems of the world. Many unique species of plants and animals are endemic to the Channel Islands, including fauna such as the Channel Islands spotted skunk, ashy storm-petrel, and flora including a unique subspecies of Torrey pine.

Flora
Flora on the Channel Islands include a unique subspecies of pine, oak, and the island tree mallow. Santa Rosa Island holds two groves of the Torrey pine subspecies Pinus torreyana var. insularis, which is endemic to the island. Torrey pines are the United States' rarest pine species. The islands also house many rare and endangered species of plants, including the island barberry, the island rushrose, and the Santa Cruz Island lace pod. Giant kelp forests surround the islands and act as a source of nutrition and protection for other animals.

Invasive species, such as the Australian blue gum tree, olive tree, sweet fennel, and Harding grass, threaten native species through competition for light, nutrients, and water. The Australian blue gum, for example, releases toxins in its leaf litter which prevents other species of plants from growing in the soil surrounding it. The blue gum, as well as other species including the Harding grass, are much more flammable and better adapted to wildfires than native species. Earthworms, thought to have come from mainland topsoil imported for road construction, are altering the unique ecosystem and microbial communities on San Clemente Island, threatening biodiversity. In this formerly earthworm-free region, they change the distribution of plants and vegetation, making it possible for non-native plants to invade.

Fauna
The Channel Islands and the waters surrounding hold many endemic species of animals, including fauna such as the Channel Islands spotted skunk, island scrub jay, ashy storm-petrel, San Clemente loggerhead shrike, and the San Clemente sage sparrow. Two breeds of livestock, the Santa Cruz sheep and the San Clemente Island goat originate from here. Many species of large marine mammals, including pacific gray whales, blue whales, humpback whales, and California sea lions breed or feed close to the Channel Islands. Current occurrences of the critically endangered North Pacific right whales and historically abundant Steller's sea lions in these areas are unknown. Seabirds, including the western gulls, bald eagles, pigeon guillemots, and Scripps's murrelets use the islands as well for shelter and breeding grounds. The endemic island fox is California's smallest natural canine and has rebounded from its near extinction in the late 1990s. Several endemic reptile and amphibian species including the island fence lizard, island night lizard, and Channel Islands slender salamander live on the islands. Thousands of years ago, pygmy mammoths and short-faced bears could also be found on the islands, despite being extinct today.

Conservation

Terrestrial

Terrestrial conservation efforts are being made to maintain the islands' endemic species. Feral livestock, including pigs, goats, and sheep, pose a threat to many of the species, including the San Clemente loggerhead shrike and Channel Islands spotted skunk. The National Park Service eradicated the feral pigs on Santa Rosa and Santa Cruz islands during the 1990s and on Santa Catalina Island in 2007. Introduced pathogens have devastated island species due to isolation from the mainland. In 1998, an outbreak of canine distemper swept through Santa Catalina Island severely reducing the island skunk and fox populations. Rabies and distemper vaccination programs were initiated to protect the island's wildlife. Canine distemper is thought to have been brought to the islands on a stowaway raccoon or a domestic dog.

In the 1950s, bald eagles and peregrine falcons on the Channel Islands became locally extinct after widespread use of pesticides such as DDT. The birds ingest contaminated fish and seabirds which poisons the adults and weakens their eggs. Golden eagles, which are natural competitors of other birds of prey, do not primarily feed on these animals and were able to colonize the islands in the early 1990s. In the early 2000s, golden eagles were live trapped and relocated. In 2002 and 2006 breeding pairs of bald eagles were reintroduced to the northern islands. Later in 2006, the introduced adult eagles hatched chicks on the islands for the first time since their extinction. The Channel Islands National Park established a bald eagle webcam on their website in 2007.

Marine

The California Channel Islands Marine Sanctuary consists of thirteen Marine Protected Areas (MPAs) around the five islands of the Channel Islands National Park. Combined, these smaller thirteen zones are 124,676 acres in size. Eleven of the zones are no-take and harvest areas and the remaining two marine conservation areas allow limited take of lobster and pelagic fish. Although there is a no-take policy, tourists are allowed to visit and observe the beautiful biodiversity. With this, there are several restrictions that limit the type and weight of gear tourists are allowed to bring including transportation–only park/private boats or planes are permitted to enter, fuel transportation, etc. In order to enforce these restrictions and preserve the MPA, the Channel Island National Marine Sanctuary Advisory Council is in charge of state waters including hiring employees and park workers. The federal waters remain under the control and protection of National Oceanic and Atmospheric Administration (NOAA). The California Channel Islands Marine Sanctuary has been moderately successful as shown in a ten year study done by the Partnership for Interdisciplinary Studies of Coastal Oceans (PISCO). From years 2003–2013, the MPA network implemented caused fish species to increase in biomass in terms of both size, numbers, and weight per area. This increase in fish population was seen both in the MPA and as spillover in the regions outside of these thirteen zones. Given the most recent General Management Plan, passed in April 2015, this MPA will continue to be monitored and protected for the next twenty to forty years in hopes of continuing its successful pattern of restoring biodiversity.

In popular culture
Aerial combat scenes for the 1970's television show Black Sheep Squadron were filmed above and around the islands.
Some scenes for the season three finale of American crime drama Bosch were set on Santa Cruz Island. Filming occurred on Santa Catalina Island.
Scott O’Dell's novel for young adults titled Island of the Blue Dolphins is based on the story of a Nicoleño woman living alone on one of the remote Channel Islands in the 19th century.
The Glass Bottom Boat, which takes place on Santa Catalina Island, is a 1966 romantic comedy starring Doris Day and Rod Taylor.
Catalina Caper, which takes place on Santa Catalina Island, is a 1967 beach party/heist movie starring Tommy Kirk and featuring Little Richard.
San Miguel is a 2012 historical novel by T. C. Boyle about two separate attempts by families to operate commercial livestock ranches on the northern island of San Miguel, one in the late 19th century and the other in the mid-20th.

See also

 Guadalupe Island and the Coronado Islands of Baja California, Mexico share the California chaparral and woodlands ecoregion with the Channel Islands
 Dwarf elephant on the Channel Islands of California
 List of islands of California

References

External links

 Channel Islands National Park
 Channel Islands National Marine Sanctuary
 Catalina Island Life During WWII
 
 Google Earth view

 
Archipelagoes of the Pacific Ocean
Landforms of Southern California
Geologic provinces of California
Biosphere reserves of the United States
Landforms of California
Landforms of Santa Barbara County, California
Landforms of Los Angeles County, California
Landforms of Ventura County, California
Archipelagoes of the United States